Lion Country Safari is a drive-through safari park and walk-through amusement park located on over 600 acres in Loxahatchee (near West Palm Beach), in Palm Beach County, Florida. Founded in 1967, it claims to be the first 'cageless zoo' in the United States.

In 2009, USA Travel Guide named Lion Country the 3rd best zoo in the nation.

Background
Developed by a group of entrepreneurs, Lion Country Safari became a place where families could experience an African safari. Due to its year round climate, South Florida proved to be an ideal location for the park.

In the beginning, the park had its own  narrow gauge railroad, the Everglade Express. The architects of Lion Country Safari based the design of the property on Jack Murphy Stadium. This attraction was eventually closed and the Crown Metal Products 4-4-0 locomotive was put on static display.  Later, the locomotive was donated to the Gold Coast Railroad Museum in Miami before finally being bought and fully restored by the Veterans Memorial Railroad, located in Bristol, Florida's Veterans Memorial Park.  It runs on that railroad to this day.

The original South Florida park is the only one remaining in operation.  Lion Country Safari previously operated parks in Irvine, California (1970–1984); Grand Prairie, Texas (1971–1992); Stockbridge, Georgia (1970–1984); Mason, Ohio (1974–1993) and Doswell, Virginia (1974–1993); all of them subsequently closed.

Exhibits

The original park in Florida consists of over 1,000 animals, throughout seven sections in the 4-mile preserve as well as the 33-acre Amusement Park.

Visitors who purchase a ticket enter the park in their own vehicle (no convertibles or soft top covers), driving slowly at their own pace, and view the animals while listening to a recorded narration which is available via streaming from SoundCloud. Many of the animals, such as giraffes, southern white rhinoceroses, and zebras, are allowed to roam freely throughout the preserve, even crossing the road in front of vehicles. Others, such as lions or chimpanzees, are segregated behind fences or water barriers.

Visitors are warned to drive slowly and carefully, to avoid stopping too close to animals, and not to open their car doors or windows. The lions, whose ability to roam freely with cars was one of the park's original attractions, were separated from visitors by a fence around the road in 2005, due to visitors ignoring warnings and opening their car doors. Additionally, opening windows near the frequently seen ostrich is not recommended, as they often peck on the reflective windows and windshields of passing cars.

A unique aspect of Lion Country Safari is the chimpanzee exhibit. The chimpanzees live on an island system where they move to a different island every day, replicating their natural nomadic lifestyle. The chimpanzees live in complex social groups, as they would in the wild. Because of this, Lion Country Safari has been useful to those interested in behavioral studies of chimpanzees. One of the chimpanzees, named Little Mama, recorded as the oldest known living chimpanzee, was born around 1938, died on November 14, 2017 from kidney failure. Lion Country Safari also serves as a retirement facility for chimpanzees who were once used in research laboratories and entertainment.

After visitors have driven through the park, they can visit Safari World, a theme park  featuring exhibits, and amusement park fare such as an Animal Theater, a petting zoo, mini golf, paddle boats, two water slides, a small water park, and the popular giraffe-feeding exhibit. Food is available at Lion Country Safari's main restaurant.

Animal species

Frasier the Sensuous Lion
The Lion Country Safari franchise in Irvine, California, briefly featured a lion that became a celebrity in his own right.

An aging circus lion from Mexico was given to the Irvine facility in 1970. Already 18 years old, analogous to a human aged 80+, the lion was toothless and ill.  Named "Frasier," he became a major attraction at the park when, despite his advanced age, Frasier fathered litters totalling 35 lion cubs by the park's pride of six lionesses.  As a result, T-shirts, watches, and other souvenirs were made featuring a photo of Frasier, which quickly became popular merchandise.

In 1973, Lion Country tried to capitalize on their star with a feature film called Frasier the Sensuous Lion.  The film featured a song, by the same title, performed by Sarah Vaughan. However, the film was a major flop, financially and critically, being roundly panned for using a different lion in Frasier′s place and for employing a voice actor for Frasier to fictionalize the story.

Frasier the Sensuous Lion died of pneumonia in 1972.  He was buried at the park, with a sendoff by the Frasier clan of Scotland, which had adopted Frasier as its mascot.

After his death, attendance at the Irvine park declined sharply. The park closed in 1984, with the owner still holding 13 years of the original 29 year lease, which he then subleased to the operators of the Wild Rivers water park, the Camp Frasier (later Camp James) summer camp and the Irvine Meadows Amphitheatre. The water park and summer camp closed in 2011, with the land turned into a housing development. The same fate befell the amphitheatre in 2016, such that the original Irvine-based Lion Country Safari land is now a 3,700-unit housing development.

In popular culture
Lion Country Safari plays a major role in Frederick Buechner's 1971 novel Lion Country.
The park was referenced in The Simpsons 1991 episode "Old Money" when the family takes a trip to Discount Lion Safari.
The story of Frasier the Sensuous Lion, and a lion portraying one of his descendants, featured prominently in The Leftovers 2017 episode "It's a Matt, Matt, Matt, Matt World".  The "Frasier the Sensuous Lion" song, as performed by Sarah Vaughan, played over the episode's closing credits.

Incidents
Bubbles the hippopotamus escaped from Lion Country Safari in Irvine, CA in 1978 and enjoyed her freedom for 19 days until she was killed, 5 months pregnant, by an overdose of tranquilizing drugs.

Notes

References
McDaniel, Sharon. "The mane attraction" The Palm Beach Post, January 6, 2006.
Gilken, Rochelle E.B. "At Lion Country, cats cut off from cars", Palm Beach Post, December 29, 2005.

External links

Memories of Lion Country Safari, Irvine, CA
Lion Country Safari on Modern Day Ruins

Protected areas of Palm Beach County, Florida
Safari parks
Tourist attractions in Palm Beach County, Florida
Zoos established in 1967
Zoos in Florida
1967 establishments in Florida